Ilkov is a surname. Notable people with the surname include:

Nikolai Ilkov (born 1955), Bulgarian Olympic canoeist
Sevdalin Ilkov, Bulgarian Olympic canoeist